Vibrissea truncorum, the water club mushroom or aquatic earth-tongue, is a species of fungus in the family Vibrisseaceae.

Description
Water club mushroom is a fungus that grows up to about 2 cm tall, with a cap 0.3 - 0.5 cm wide. It is characterized by its yellow, orange, or reddish fruiting body, and white to bluish-gray stem, darkening to brown at the base.

Range
Vibrissea truncorum is a cosmopolitan mushroom, found throughout the Northern Hemisphere, including Europe, North America, Japan, and rarely in eastern Russia and Chile. It is most heavily concentrated in Norway, Sweden, Finland, and Western Russia, though it appears also in the United Kingdom and Southwestern Europe.

Habitat
Water club mushroom often grows on partially or completely submerged wood in streams at higher elevations.

Ecology

Etymology

Taxonomy

References

Helotiales